Demon Box is a 1986 collection of works by Ken Kesey.  The book includes nonfiction and fiction short stories as well as some of Kesey's essays.

Background
Kesey explained why the collection of semi-autobiographical essays was titled Demon Box:
"When Viking was bringing it out," he said, "they were desperate for something to call it. I told them, 'Don't call it anything .' It isn't a novel; it isn't an autobiography; it isn't journalism; I think of it as a box in which all this stuff goes." To his publisher, Kesey started calling the book a "box novel," a new form of literature. "If I were to think of it as a (traditional) novel, I would have joined it together and had a gradual progression of thematic movement and character change through it, but I didn't want to do that." Kesey also explained he considered the idea of publishing the essays in pamphlet form, then putting the pamphlets in a box and selling the box.

Contents

 D Tank Kickout
 Joon the Goon was What
 Mother's Day 1969: Quiston's Report
 Tranny Man Over the Border
 Abdul & Ebenezer
 The Day After Superman Died
 The Search for the Secret Pyramid
 Killer
 Oleo: Demon Briefs and Dopey Ditties
 Finding Doctor Fung
 Run into Great Wall
 Little Tricker the Squirrel Meets Big Double the Bear - by Grandma Whittier
 Good Friday - by Grandma Whittier
 Now We Know How Many Holes It Takes to Fill the Albert Hall
 The Demon Box: An Essay
 Last Time the Angels Came Up
 demon box they take control and Ur suck with them

References 

1986 short story collections
American non-fiction books
American short story collections
Viking Press books
Works by Ken Kesey